McGary is an unincorporated community in Gibson County, Indiana, in the United States.

History
The community was named for Hugh D. McGary, the original owner of the town site. The McGary post office was discontinued in 1901.

References

Unincorporated communities in Gibson County, Indiana
Unincorporated communities in Indiana